Taribah is a small town in Hadramaut, Yemen, about  East of the capital city of San'a. It consists of three or four villages, some isolated houses and a wide expanse of palm trees.

Many Hadhramis of Taribah have travelled to foreign lands in search of their fortune in life, and have died there. Despite the solitude of interment in distant lands, those who have died overseas are not forgotten in Hadhramaut. It is as if by being remembered, these sons of Taribah have in some manner been returned home.

A strange phenomenon is sometimes noticeable in Masjid Badr in the town, especially during the silent afternoon prayers of dhuhr or ‘asr. While the prayer is in progress, faint yet distinct whispers can be heard clearly, apparently coming from all directions at once. The intensity of the whispers never changes - even when one is in solitary prayer, the whispers can be heard at a constant level. And even more intriguing, the whispers are only heard when one is praying.

References

  تاربه ، حضرموت

Populated places in Hadhramaut Governorate